Jimena Fernández (970-1045) was queen of León and Navarre as the wife of García Sánchez II of Pamplona  She acted as regent for her son Sancho III in circa 1004-1010 i co-regency with her mother-in-law Urraca Fernández and the bishops of Navarre.

Notes

Navarrese royal consorts
11th-century women rulers
970 births
1045 deaths